{{Infobox Ethnic group
|group=Montgomery Creek Rancheria
|population=1800 Pit River Indians, 15 living on rancheria<ref name=sdsu>"Montgomery Creek Rancheria." SDSU: California Indians and their Reservations." Retrieved 29 Nov 2012.</ref>
|popplace=
|rels=traditional tribal religion, Christianity
|langs=English
|related=other Pit River Indians
}}

The Montgomery Creek Rancheria is a 
federal Indian reservation belonging to members of the Pit River Tribe, a federally recognized tribe of indigenous people of California. The ranchería is located in Shasta County in northern California.

Established in 1915, Montgomery Creek Rancheria is  large and is located in the unincorporated community of Montgomery Creek, about 35 miles northeast of Redding, California.

Education
The ranchería is served by the Mountain Union Elementary School District and Shasta Union High School District.

Notes

References
 Pritzker, Barry M. A Native American Encyclopedia: History, Culture, and Peoples.'' Oxford: Oxford University Press, 2000. .

External links
 Pit River Tribe, official website

Pit River tribes
Maidu
Populated places in Shasta County, California
American Indian reservations in California
Native American tribes in California
Federally recognized tribes in the United States